Pudsey is a town between Leeds and Bradford, in West Yorkshire, England

Pudsey may also refer to:

 Pudsey (UK Parliament constituency) (1885–1918 and 1950–present)
 Pudsey (ward), an electoral ward of the Leeds City Council
 Pudsey, Calderdale a hamlet near Todmorden, West Yorkshire, England
 Bishop Pudsey (1125-1195), Bishop of Durham 
 Richard Pudsey (fl. 1492), English politician
 Pudsey Bear, mascot of the British TV programme, Children in Need
 Pudsey, the dog in the Ashleigh and Pudsey act, winners of 2012 Britain's Got Talent
 Pudsey the Dog: The Movie, a 2014 British 3D live action family comedy film